"Dreamgirl" is a song by the Dave Matthews Band that appears on their 2005 studio album, Stand Up. The song, which was written by Dave Matthews and producer Mark Batson, was the second radio single released in support of the album. The music video for the song features Julia Roberts, a longtime fan of the band.

Track listing
American radio promo
 "Dreamgirl" (radio mix) - 3:32
 "Dreamgirl" (album version) - 4:01
 Suggested callout hook - 0:10

Charts

References

External links
Official music video

2005 singles
Dave Matthews Band songs
Music videos directed by Dave Meyers (director)
Songs written by Dave Matthews
Song recordings produced by Mark Batson
2005 songs
Songs written by Mark Batson
RCA Records singles